This is a list of films either produced or distributed by Summit Entertainment.

Films

1990s

2000s

2010s

2020s

Upcoming

References

Summit Entertainment

Summit